Teri Woods (born March 8, 1968) is an American novelist from Philadelphia, Pennsylvania, and a successful, self-published pioneer of the urban fiction genre.

Woods finished writing her first novel, True to the Game, in 1992 while working at a law firm in Philadelphia. She spent six years submitting the work to numerous publishers, all of which rejected her. In 1998, Woods had copies of the book printed herself and began to hand-sell the novel to booksellers in and around the Philadelphia area and, eventually, across the United States, eventually starting Teri Woods Publishing, a self-publishing house to put out her own work and that of others, principally in the urban fiction genre, aimed at a demographic largely ignored by major publishers. Woods's breakout success helped her negotiate a multimillion-dollar contract with Hachette Book Group USA to re-release her previously published novels.

In 2015, it was announced that True to the Game was being produced into a film of the same name.

Woods is the sister of Dexter Wansel, American keyboardist.

External links
Teri Woods Publishing
Teri Woods, Author Profile on AALBC

Notes

20th-century American novelists
21st-century American novelists
African-American novelists
Writers from Philadelphia
American women novelists
20th-century American women writers
21st-century American women writers
Living people
Novelists from Pennsylvania
1968 births
20th-century African-American women
21st-century African-American women writers
21st-century African-American writers